Music in the Air is a 1934 American romantic comedy musical film based on Jerome Kern and Oscar Hammerstein II's Broadway musical of the same name. It was part of the popular subgenre of operetta films made during the era. The film was a commercial failure on its release, losing $389,000. This was the worst performing release by Fox Film that year.

The Broadway musical Music in the Air opened at the Alvin Theatre in New York City on November 8, 1932, and ran for 342 performances.

Plot
Aspiring songwriter Karl Roder (Douglass Montgomery) travels to the big city, along with a girl he is in love with, Sieglinde Lessing (June Lang), and her Father Walter Lessing (Al Shean) who has just written a new song that he thinks will take the world by storm (with lyrics by Karl).

They stumble into the stormy relationship of Opera star Frieda Hotzfelt (Gloria Swanson), and librettist Bruno Mahler (John Boles) who constantly bicker and make up. When the composer for their new show suddenly leaves town, they decide to use Walters song, partially out of convienince, and party due to the fact that Bruno has fallen in love with Sieglinde, and Frieda has fallen in love with Karl, though he does not reciprocate.

Karl, realizing the city is no place for him, decides to go back to the village, but Bruno convinces Sieglinde that she is destined for the stage, and she stays behind to replace Frieda as the Prima Donna in the opera. However, as the opening night approaches, the cast and crew all determine that Sieglinde can not act, and they ask Frieda to come back and star in the show.

Walter calls them all cruel for breaking his daughters heart, but they tell him that the audience is crueler, and they are being spared the worst of it. At the end of the day, the feelings of two amateurs are not more important than the livelihood of the crew who deserve to put on a good show.

Sieglinde and Walter return to their town, and Sieglinde goes to apologize to Karl with her tail between her legs for not listening to him, but Walter can still be proud that his music is featured in a real show, and the whole town listens to it together on the radio. Meanwhile, Frieda and Bruno are together again, and also fighting. .

Cast
Gloria Swanson as Frieda Hotzfelt
John Boles as Bruno Mahler
Douglass Montgomery as Karl Roder
June Lang as Sieglinde Lessing
Al Shean as Dr. Walter Lessing
Reginald Owen as Ernst Weber
Joseph Cawthorn as Hans Uppman
Hobart Bosworth as Cornelius
Sara Haden as Martha
Marjorie Main as Anna
Roger Imhof as Burgomaster
Jed Prouty as Kirschner
Christian Rub as Zipfelhuber
Fuzzy Knight as Nick
George Chandler as Assistant Stage Manager
 Claire Rochelle as Dancer 
Donald Haines as Peanut Vendor (uncredited)

References

Bibliography
 Solomon, Aubrey. The Fox Film Corporation, 1915-1935: A History and Filmography (McFarland, 2011).

External links

1934 films
1934 musical comedy films
American black-and-white films
American films based on plays
Films directed by Joe May
Films about opera
1934 romantic comedy films
American romantic musical films
Operetta films
Films set in Bavaria
American musical comedy films
Films produced by Erich Pommer
Films with screenplays by Billy Wilder
1930s romantic musical films
Fox Film films
1930s American films